KLHO-LD, virtual channel 31 and UHF digital channel 26, branded on-air as TV Alabanza, is a low-powered Spanish religious independent television station licensed to Oklahoma City, Oklahoma, United States.

KLHO-LP
The station was originally licensed for analog operation on channel 17 on June 16, 1999. The analog license was cancelled by the Federal Communications Commission on June 12, 2015.

Digital channels
The station's digital signal is multiplexed:

References

External links

LHO-LD
LHO-LD
Television channels and stations established in 1995
1995 establishments in Oklahoma